Canon Walter William Covey-Crump (1865–1949) was an Anglican priest, serving as curate and vicar in the diocese of Ely, Cambridgeshire for over fifty years. He also held "high positions" as a Freemason, involving himself in Masonic research. He produced numerous theological and Masonic publications, some of which were still being reprinted in the 21st century.

He came from a modest background, but was accepted as an undergraduate at Ayerst Hall, Cambridge, where he underwent theological training. He inherited the surname, "Crump", but took on the additional name of "Covey" from his friend Richard Covey, bursar of Ayerst Hall and fellow curate in Cambridgeshire. He was married with three sons, the second of whom was Commander A.T.L. Covey-Crump. His grandson is Rogers Covey-Crump.

Background
Covey-Crump came from a modest background. His paternal grandparents were agricultural labourer William Crump, and his wife Ann. His parents were merchant's clerk and cooper, Richard Crump, and Elizabeth Prestidge. He was born as Walter William Crump in Birmingham on 4 October 1865. When he was fourteen, he was apprenticed to a book-printer of evangelical tendencies, and attended his youth Bible class.

Education and training
It was after attending evening classes that Crump was able to win a scholarship to Ayerst Hall, Cambridge, "a hostel ... designed to aid men of modest means in obtaining a university degree and theological training", where he read mathematics, and received his Bachelor of Arts in 1891, and his Master of Arts in 1895. His landlord in Cambridge was Richard Covey, who by then was old and nearly blind, so that Crump had to read to him. This sparked an interest in "ancient languages including Hebrew, Sanskrit, Egyptian Hieroglyphics and Greek". In 1891 it was Richard Covey who sponsored him financially at the Cambridge Clergy Training School.

Double-barrelled surname
Covey-Crump's parents were named Crump, and they registered him with that name. When he became curate of Cottenham, Cambridgeshire, he again met Reverend Richard Covey (Birmingham  – Cambridge 2 August 1903), the unmarried curate of nearby Rampton, and friend of the family who had been bursar of Ayerst Hall when Crump was an undergraduate, and had assisted him with educational sponsorship. The 1891 census finds "Walter William Crump" visiting Covey at his rectory in Dry Drayton parish. Richard Covey drew up his last will in 1901, leaving the most part of his estate to Walter William Crump. There was no suggestion in the will that Crump should add Covey's name to his as a condition of the legacy. Crump took on the additional name of Covey before Richard Covey died. He formalised the name, "Covey", by deed poll on 5 March 1903, shortly before he married; by that time he was already using it as a  double-barrelled surname. His immediate family was using the surname, Covey-Crump, by 1911, as recorded in the census, and in the registered surnames of his children.

Marriage
Covey-Crump's wife was Hilda Sophia née Porter, and they married on 11 June 1903 at St Mary's Church, St Neots, where he was serving as curate. Covey-Crump had three sons: musician Lewis Charles Leslie, Commander Alwyn Thomas Lavender Covey-Crump, and Leo William Rolf M.A. (King's), who served in the Royal Naval Voluntary Reserve in World War II. His grandson, via his son Lewis Charles Leslie, is the musician Rogers Covey-Crump. Covey-Crump died in Ely on 27 April 1949, and left £2,882 net. His funeral took place on 2 May 1949.

Career

Curate
Covey-Crump's first position was the curacy of All Saints' Church, Cottenham, from 1892 to 1894. It was there that he learned bell-ringing, one of his lasting interests. Opening a fête 44 years later, he recalled his time there: In those days the organist lived in Cambridge, and if he did not come we turned the handle of a barrel organ and ground the tune out ... The hymns went all right, but in the Psalms it was not so easy ... The clock had one hand and indicated the nearest quarter of an hour.

He was curate of St Mary the Virgin, Longstowe, from 1894 to 1895; of Holy Trinity, Haddenham, from 1896 to 1902; and of St Mary's Church, St Neots, from 1902 to 1904.

Vicar and rural dean
Covey-Crump was vicar of St Thomas, Stopsley, from 1904 to 1910. While there he was the subject of controversy when he became vice-chairman of the parish council, which was populated with Nonconformists, one of whom feared that he "would be casting a net to catch fish". At Stopsley he home-schooled his three children as a musical family. They all attended King's College School, and they all became members of the Choir of King's College, Cambridge. He was vicar of St Mark's Church, Friday Bridge, Cambridgeshire in the Ely diocese, from 1910. 

From 1925 Covey-Crump was the rural dean of Wisbech. In 1932, the population of his parish was 930, and the net income from his benefice in that year was £370, plus tenancy of the Friday Bridge vicarage. On 5 July 1932, he gave "a most interesting lecture ... on the history of the Bible" to the Whittlesey Women's Institute. In July 1934 Covey-Crump was nominated to serve as rural dean of Wisbech for five years, although he resigned the position in 1938. He left the incumbency of Friday Bridge for that of St James, Newton-in-the-Isle, in 1935, writing a modest farewell note to his parishioners: "The energetic and popular rector ... Mr Wells ... is a clergyman of broad views and varied experience who will, I am sure, do his utmost to carry on the organisations in the parish, and may succeed in other ways wherein I have failed. I ask you, therefore, to give him a cordial welcome". He was invited to crown the Rose Queen at the 1935 Rose Queen Festival at Sutton St James, where he gave a speech on the emblem of the rose in that type of crowning ceremony.

Canon
He was nominated to the honorary canonry in Ely Cathedral in March 1936, by the Bishop of Ely, Dr Bernard Heywood, who said that "he could find no-one more worthy than the rector of Newton. The honour is one that has been well earned by the rural dean who since his ordination has given the whole of his service, over more than 50 years, in the diocese". Covey-Crump retired in 1942, aged 77 years. However he continued to officiate at weddings.

Institutions

Freemasonry
Covey-Crump was a Freemason from at least 1910. "He [was] well known in the Masonic world, having held high positions and taken a great part in Masonic research". On 12 January 1927, he was appointed and invested a prelate of the Order of the Red Cross of Constantine at Mark Masons' Hall, London. At some point before 1936 he was Assistant Grand Chaplain of England. In 1936 Covey-Crump read an "address dealing with certain historical aspects of Masonic emblems" to the 54th regular meeting of the Suffolk Installed Masters' Lodge of Freemasons at Saxmundham.

Other institutions
Covey-Crump was elected general secretary of the Wisbech branch of the Society for the Propagation of the Gospel in Foreign Parts (SPG) in June 1930. He was also a vice-president of Wisbech Museum in 1936.

Publications

Anglican publications
  (Reprint; original publication date 1 January 1914).

Masonic publications
 Covey-Crump, W.W., (1915) The Symbolic Significance of the Middle Chamber.
 .
 .
 Covey-Crump, W.W., (1920) Our Symbolic System.
 Covey-Crump, W.W., (1929) Biblical Evidence Concerning Hiram.
  (Also further editions in 1936 and 1956).
  (Original publication: Covey-Crump, W.W., The Hiramic Tradition: a Survey of Hypotheses Concerning it (1934), Masonic record, Incorporated). There was also an earlier version as a paper (1932).
 .
 Covey-Crump, W.W., (1948) The Rainbow – a Sign.
  (Reprint; original publication date unknown).
  (Reprint: original publication date unknown).
  (Reprint: original publication date unknown)
  (Reprint: original publication date unknown)
  (Reprint: original publication date unknown)
  (Reprint: original publication date unknown)
  (Reprint: original publication date unknown)
  (Reprint: original publication date unknown)
  (Reprint: original publication date unknown)

General publications
  (Reprint; original publication date unknown)

Notes

References

External links

1865 births
1949 deaths
20th-century English Anglican priests
People from Birmingham, West Midlands
Canons (priests)
People from Cambridgeshire
Freemasons
Antiquarians